Gregory Scott Cummins (born 1956) is an American character actor known for his recurring roles in It's Always Sunny in Philadelphia and Bosch.

Filmography

Film

Television

References

External links

http://www.gregoryscottcummins.com/ Official Website

1956 births
American male film actors
American male television actors
Male actors from California
Living people
Date of birth missing (living people)
People from Orinda, California